The Arboretum d'Olhain (2 hectares) is an arboretum located in the Forêt Domaniale d'Olhain near Olhain, Fresnicourt-le-Dolmen, Pas-de-Calais, Nord-Pas-de-Calais, France. It is open daily without charge.

See also 
 List of botanical gardens in France
 National Forest (France)

References 
 Parc d'Olhain
 L'Echo des Chênaies entry
 Ecogardes Été 2008 (French)

Olhain, Arboretum d'
Olhain, Arboretum d'